Ohio is divided into 15 congressional districts, each represented by a member of the United States House of Representatives.

Election district disputes in the 2010s 
After the 2010 census, Ohio lost two House seats due to slow population growth compared to the national average, and a new map was signed into law on September 26, 2011.

On May 3, 2019, a three-judge panel from the United States District Court for the Southern District of Ohio declared the Ohio's 2012 district map contrary to Article One of the United States Constitution, as "an unconstitutional partisan gerrymander" and ordered "the enactment of a constitutionally viable replacement" prior to the 2020 elections. An appeal made to the U.S. Supreme Court resulted in the order to redraw the map being nullified.

2021 redistricting 

Starting in the 2022 midterms, per the 2020 United States census, Ohio will lose a congressional seat. On November 17, 2021, after lengthy discussions, a new map was passed by the Ohio House of Representatives 55-36, along party lines, with no Democrat voting in favor of the map. The map was sent to Governor of Ohio, Mike DeWine, where he accepted it 3 days later on November 20th. 

The map has been controversial, as Democrats accuse the map of being purposefully designed to benefit Republicans. By December 7, 2021, six lawsuits had been filed against the new 15-seat congressional map, citing it as "racially discriminatory".  The proposed map favors Republican to Democratic districts by a 12-3 margin.

On January 14, 2022, the Ohio Supreme Court declared the map a partisan gerrymander, violating Article XIX of the Constitution of Ohio, in a 4-3 decision. The Ohio General Assembly had 30 days to draw a new map.

On March 16, 2022, the Ohio Supreme Court rejected the new proposed state legislative district map for the third time.  The decision will most likely force Ohio to postpone its primary elections, scheduled to take place on May 3, until new maps of both state legislative seats and districts for the United States House of Representatives pass constitutional muster.

Current districts and representatives
The following table is a list of members of the United States House delegation from Ohio, their terms, their district boundaries, and the district political ratings according to the CPVI. The delegation in the 118th United States Congress has a total of 15 members, with 10 Republicans and 5 Democrats.

Historical district boundaries

Obsolete districts
Ohio's at-large congressional district
Ohio's 16th congressional district
Ohio's 17th congressional district
Ohio's 18th congressional district
Ohio's 19th congressional district
Ohio's 20th congressional district
Ohio's 21st congressional district
Ohio's 22nd congressional district
Ohio's 23rd congressional district
Ohio's 24th congressional district

See also
List of United States congressional districts
United States congressional delegations from Ohio
History of 19th-century congressional redistricting in Ohio

References

External links